Puerto Rico Highway 585 (PR-585) is tertiary state highway in Ponce, Puerto Rico. The road leads from PR-2R in Sector Pámpanos of Barrio Canas to Avenida Padre Noel in Barrio Playa. It runs west to east, starting from its western terminus at PR-2R (Carretera Pámpanos) and ending at its eastern terminus at PR-123 (Avenida Hostos).

Major intersections

See also

 List of highways in Ponce, Puerto Rico
 List of highways numbered 585

References

External links

 Guía de Carreteras Principales, Expresos y Autopistas 

585
Roads in Ponce, Puerto Rico